"Unforgiven" is a song by American rock band Sevendust. It was released on August 28, 2018 by Rise as the second single from the band twelfth studio album, All I See Is War.

Charts

References

Sevendust songs
2018 singles
2018 songs
Songs written by Clint Lowery
Songs written by Morgan Rose
American hard rock songs